Tridentopsis is a genus of pencil catfishes native to South America.

Species
There are currently three recognized species in this genus:
 Tridentopsis cahuali Azpelicueta, 1990
 Tridentopsis pearsoni Myers, 1925
 Tridentopsis tocantinsi La Monte, 1939

T. cahuali originates from the Paraguay River basin in Argentina. T. pearsoni inhabits the upper Amazon River basin in Bolivia. T. tocantinsi lives in the Tocantins River basin in Brazil. Tridentopsis species grow to about 2.2–2.3 centimetres (.87–.91 in) SL.

References

Trichomycteridae
Fish of South America
Fish of the Amazon basin
Fish of Argentina
Fish of Brazil
Fish of Bolivia
Taxa named by George S. Myers
Catfish genera
Freshwater fish genera